The 2006 Euroseries 3000 was the eighth Euro Formula 3000 season. The series was won by Italian Giacomo Ricci for the FMS International team.

Teams and drivers

Race calendar
Rounds denoted with a blue background are a part of the Italian Formula 3000 Championship.

Championship Standings
 Points for both championships are awarded as follows:

In addition:
 One point will be awarded for Pole position for Race One
 One point will be awarded for fastest lap in each race

Driver standings

F3000 Italian Championship

Team standings

F3000 Italian Championship

References

External links
Official Euroseries 3000 site
Reference: 
Reference: 
Reference: 

Auto GP
Euroseries 3000
Euroseries 3000